Cacau Show is a Brazilian chocolate manufacturer based in Itapevi, São Paulo. The company was founded by seventeen-year-old Alexandre Tadeu da Costa in 1988 from his sales of chocolate Easter eggs using door-to-door catalogs.

History

Early history 
In 1988, Alexandre Costa borrowed US$ 500 from a relative to purchase ingredients and molds to make his own chocolate. He started his little business in the district Casa Verde, located in the northern part of São Paulo. He grew his business to a manufacturing and retail giant progressively. Today, it has more than 2800 franchise stores throughout Brazil that are supplied by a massive factory outside São Paulo turning over more than $1 billion each year in all the franchise stores.

Shortly after the initial steps, Costa invited his high-school friend Sergio Butuem to join the company. The partnership worked well for 25 years, while Costa represented the image of entrepreneur and chocolate specialist Butuem worked behind the scenes organizing, studying and planning. According to Costa in an article for Exame magazine, Butuem was the person mostly responsible to adapt his plans to reality.

Since 2000 
The first store was opened in 2001, and great demand for the franchise due to the quality of the products and accessibility in prices accelerated its expansion. In 2008, it surpassed the American company Rocky Mountain to become the largest chain of chocolates in the world in terms of the number of stores. Nowadays the chain is the third largest franchise operation in Brazil and produces more than 50 million pounds of chocolate per year.

In 2011, Cacau Show and the founder won the prize, Ernst&Young Entrepreneur of the Year, in Brazil and represented Brazil in the competition, World Entrepreneur of the Year, in Monaco. In 2013 Cacau Show won the prize World Retail Awards in France as the Emerging Market Retailer of the Year.

The exponential growth of the company is still due to the opening of stores in capitals of the country and points where there was little competition. The company plans to operate in the international market through franchising in the future. Currently, the company is present in more than 1000 Brazilian cities.

References

External links

 

1988 establishments in Brazil
Brazilian brands
Brazilian chocolate companies
Companies based in São Paulo (state)
Food and drink companies established in 1988
Franchised formats